Stephen Lee Viksten (July 19, 1960 – June 23, 2014) was an American television writer and voice actor who was best known for voicing the character Oskar Kokoshka on the Nickelodeon animated series Hey Arnold!. Viksten also wrote multiple episodes of Hey Arnold, Rugrats, Recess, Duckman and The Simpsons. Viksten's sole contribution to the latter, season 22's "Homer Scissorhands", was his final writing credit before his death.

Early life
Viksten was born in Ventura, California on July 19, 1960. His father was the vice president of the local Sears. During his teenage years, Viksten's family moved to Arcadia, California, where Viksten became editor of Arcadia High School's newspaper. After graduating from Arcadia High School in 1978, Viksten attended several universities including the University of Missouri, UCLA, and Cal State Fullerton, though he did not obtain a bachelor's degree.

Death
Viksten died on June 23, 2014, at age 53. The TV film Hey Arnold!: The Jungle Movie, released three years later, was dedicated to his memory.

References

External links
 

1960 births
2014 deaths
American male voice actors
American television writers
California State University, Fullerton alumni
American male television writers
Male actors from California
People from Arcadia, California
People from Ventura, California
University of California, Los Angeles alumni
University of Missouri alumni
Screenwriters from California